Marin Ljubičić (born 28 February 2002) is a Croatian professional footballer who plays as a centre forward for Austrian Bundesliga side LASK

Club career
Nicknamed "the Split Mbappé", Ljubičić was born and raised in Split to family from Runovići. His great performances for the Hajduk U19s earned him a promotion to the senior team in spring 2021, during the tenure of Paolo Tramezzani. He made his debut for senior Hajduk side on 2 March 2021, in a 3–0 Croatian Cup victory over Zagreb, coming off the bench in the 79th minute and replacing Mehmet Umut Nayir. Ljubičić made his senior league debut for Hajduk on 20 March 2021, in a Dalmatian derby against Šibenik at Stadion Poljud. He came off the bench in the 62nd minute, replacing Tonio Teklić, and converted Mario Vušković's cross to score the only goal in the 1–0 victory. He was praised by Inter Milan winger Ivan Perišić after the performance. On 29 March, Ljubičić signed a contract with the club until 2026.

On 22 July 2021, in his European debut in a Conference League qualifier, Ljubičić scored a brace in a 2–0 victory over Tobol.

Career statistics

References

External links
 

2002 births
Living people
Footballers from Split, Croatia
Association football forwards
Croatian footballers
Croatia youth international footballers
Croatia under-21 international footballers
HNK Hajduk Split II players
HNK Hajduk Split players
LASK players
First Football League (Croatia) players
Croatian Football League players
Austrian Football Bundesliga players
Croatian expatriate footballers
Expatriate footballers in Austria
Croatian expatriate sportspeople in Austria